The 1986 Portuguese Grand Prix was a Formula One motor race held at Estoril on 21 September 1986. It was the fourteenth race of the 1986 FIA Formula One World Championship.

The 70-lap race was won by British driver Nigel Mansell, driving a Williams-Honda. Brazilian Ayrton Senna took pole position in his Lotus-Renault, but Mansell passed him at the start and led the entire race, also setting the fastest race lap. Senna held on to second place until he ran out of fuel on the final lap and dropped to fourth, promoting Frenchman Alain Prost in the McLaren-TAG to second and Mansell's Brazilian teammate Nelson Piquet to third.

The win, Mansell's fifth of the season, gave him a ten-point lead in the Drivers' Championship with two races remaining, with Piquet second and Prost a further point back in third. Senna's final-lap misfortune ended his challenge for the title. The win also secured the Constructors' Championship for Williams, their third in all.

Classification

Qualifying

Race

Championship standings after the race
Bold text indicates the World Champions.

Drivers' Championship standings

Constructors' Championship standings

References

External links
 Grand Prix Archive Video

Portuguese Grand Prix
Grand Prix
Portuguese Grand Prix